A list of books and essays about Francis Ford Coppola:

The Godfather

Coppola
Francis Ford Coppola